José Faria (born 24 July 1957) is a Portuguese sports shooter. He competed in the mixed trap event at the 1984 Summer Olympics.

References

1957 births
Living people
Portuguese male sport shooters
Olympic shooters of Portugal
Shooters at the 1984 Summer Olympics
Place of birth missing (living people)